The discography of Icelandic singer-songwriter Björk consists of ten studio albums, two soundtrack albums, one compilation album, six remix albums, seven live albums, four box sets, three collaboration albums, forty-one singles, six promotional singles and eight remixes series.

Björk started her career after a recording of her rendition of Tina Charles' 1976 song "I Love to Love" became popular on Icelandic radio. Her first eponymous solo release, considered juvenilia, was released under Fálkinn label in 1977. Thereafter, Björk ventured into bands, singing as the lead vocalist of groups like Tappi Tíkarrass, Kukl, the Elgar Sisters and, most notably, the Sugarcubes. In 1990 she released Gling-Gló alongside Tríó Guðmundar Ingólfssonar, a cover album of jazz standards.

Björk released her first adult solo studio album, titled Debut, in 1993, under One Little Independent Records. A sleeper hit in United Kingdom, the record eventually hit the top three in the Official Charts Company and received platinum certifications from BPI, RIAA and ARIA. The album included the singer's debut single "Human Behaviour", which gained chart success on Billboard Alternative and Dance charts. The album was later reissued to include the third single "Play Dead", taken from the soundtrack of The Young Americans, which became her first top 20 single on BPI charts. Subsequent singles "Big Time Sensuality" and "Violently Happy" also obtained moderate chart success and recurrent rotation on MTV. Her second album, Post, was released in June 1995, and peaked at number two in the UK and was certified platinum by BPI and RIAA. The album spawned three top 10 singles in the UK, including "Army of Me", "Hyperballad" and "It's Oh So Quiet", which became her best-selling single and was certified gold by BPI. The album was followed by a companion remix album, called Telegram (1996).

Björk focused on combining electronic beats with string instruments with her third album Homogenic (1997), which sold 1 million copies around Europe. In 2000, Björk starred in Lars von Trier's feature film Dancer in the Dark, for which she also composed the companion soundtrack Selmasongs. "I've Seen It All", a promotional single from the album, received an Academy Award nomination for Best Original Song. Vespertine, the singer's fourth studio album, was released in 2001 and was certified Gold in the UK. The following year, Björk released her Greatest Hits compilation, a companion box-set, Family Tree, and a series of live albums, collected in the Live Box box set.

In 2004, Björk released her fifth studio album, titled Medúlla, composed almost entirely using human voices and sounds. Its first promotional single, "Oceania", was commissioned by the International Olympic Committee for the 2004 Summer Olympics and debuted at the 2004 Summer Olympics opening ceremony in Athens. The next year, Björk starred in and composed the soundtrack for Matthew Barney's Drawing Restraint 9. Björk released her sixth studio album, Volta, in 2007. The album was her first to reach the top 10 on the Billboard 200 chart, while its first single "Earth Intruders" is Björk highest charting single on the Billboard Hot 100 chart. The 2009 release Voltaïc, is a companion box-set consisting of live and remix recordings.

Björk's seventh studio album Biophilia (2011), was a multimedia project encompassing various apps for each song, a series of educational workshops in four continents, a worldwide tour and a documentary. After releasing several remixes as a part of "The Crystalline Series" and the "Biophilia Remix Series", Björk released a remix album titled Bastards in 2012. After the end of the tour, the singer released her sixth live album, Björk: Biophilia Live. Coinciding with a MoMa exhibition on her career, Björk released her eighth studio album, Vulnicura in 2015. The album was followed by the "Vulnicura Remix Series", an acoustic album called Vulnicura Strings, and a live album, Vulnicura Live.

Björk's ninth studio album, Utopia, was released in November 2017. Her tenth studio album, Fossora, was released on 30 September 2022.

Albums

Studio albums

Soundtrack albums

Compilation albums

Remix albums

Live albums

Box sets

Collaboration albums

Video albums

Singles

As lead artist

As featured artist

Promotional singles

Remixes series

See also

 Björk videography
 List of songs recorded by Björk
 Enjoyed: A Tribute to Björk's Post, a tribute album released by Stereogum
 List of best-selling albums by country (Iceland)

Notes

References

External links

  Björk discography

Discography
Discographies of Icelandic artists
Pop music discographies